Portsmouth Rovers F.C. was an English association football club based in the village of Portsmouth, which was then in Lancashire. The team spent four years in the second division of the Lancashire Combination between 1911 and 1915, but consistently finished near the foot of the table. Portsmouth Rovers also entered the FA Cup, the foremost cup competition in England, on several occasions and reached the first qualifying round twice. For seven consecutive seasons from 1919–20 to 1925–26, they were knocked out in the preliminary round. Portsmouth Rovers participated in the Cup for the final time on 4 September 1926, but lost to Walsden United in the extra preliminary round by a single goal.

Several notable footballers began their careers with Portsmouth Rovers; goalkeeper Jerry Dawson went on to become an England international, while local full-back Clem Rigg played over 250 professional matches for Nelson.

FA Cup results

References

Defunct football clubs in England
Lancashire Combination
Defunct football clubs in Lancashire
Defunct football clubs in West Yorkshire